Rist is a surname. Notable people with the surname include:

 Boy Rist, Norwegian officer and WWII resistance fighter 
 Charles Rist (1874–1955), French economist
 Gilbert Rist (born 1938), Swiss academic
 Johann Rist (1607–1667), German dramatist and poet
 John Rist (born 1936), British scholar of ancient philosophy and classics 
 Léonard Rist (1905–1982), French economist and banker; first chief economist of the World Bank
 Liisi Rist (born 1991), Estonian racing cyclist
 Pipilotti Rist (born 1962), Swiss visual artist
 Robbie Rist (born 1964), American actor
 Will Rist (born 1987), English cricketer

See also
 RIST is an acronym for the Reynolds Intellectual Screening Test.
 Rist Mountain is part of the Marcy Group in the Adirondack Mountains
 Reliable Internet Stream Transport - A video streaming protocol

Dutch-language surnames
English-language surnames
Estonian-language surnames
German-language surnames
Norwegian-language surnames